A list of science fiction films released before the 1920s. These films include core elements of science fiction and are widely available with reviews by reputable
critics or film historians.

See also
 History of science fiction films

References

 
Lists of 1890s films by genre
Lists of 1900s films by genre
Lists of 1910s films by genre
1890s